Shahzada Mirza Muhammad Sulaiman Shah Bahadur Gorkhani (September 1846 – 11 May 1890) was the Head of the Timurid dynasty from around March 1878 to May 1890.

Life 
He was the son and successor of Shahzada Mirza Muhammad Hidayat Afza Ilahi Bakhsh Bahadur by his first wife, Nawababadi Begum Sahiba. The British Indian government recognised him by the GOI as the Chief Representative of the Royal House of Delh. He was succeeded by his brother, Shahzada Mirza Muhammad Kaiwan Shah Gorkhani Suraya Jah Bahadur.

References

Timurid dynasty
Mughal Empire
Mughal nobility